Phyllis Dawson (born July 27, 1957) is an American equestrian. She competed in two events at the 1988 Summer Olympics.

References

External links
 

1957 births
Living people
American female equestrians
Olympic equestrians of the United States
Equestrians at the 1988 Summer Olympics
Sportspeople from Fairfax, Virginia
21st-century American women